Gregory Nappo (born August 25, 1988) is an American professional baseball pitcher who is currently a free agent. He reached Triple-A for the first time in 2013.

He was born in Manhattan, New York and attended Daniel Hand High School. He pitched for the University of Connecticut in 2007 and from 2009 to 2011, posting respective records and ERAs of 4-3, 3.50; 3-4, 6.06; 8-5, 4.44; and 10-2, 2.55. The Florida Marlins drafted him in the 18th round of the 2011 Major League Baseball Draft. He played for the Jamestown Jammers and Greensboro Grasshoppers in 2011, going 4-1 with a 3.44 ERA and a 1.055 WHIP in 55 innings; he also averaged 9.5 strikeouts per nine innings. In 2012, with Greensboro, he was 2-2 with a 2.77 ERA in 40 games, striking out 103 batters in 78 innings. On April 24 of that year, he took part in a no-hitter against the Hickory Crawdads, relieving pitcher Jose Fernandez. His WHIP was 1.051. He was a South Atlantic League Mid-Season All-Star that year. In 2013, between the Jupiter Hammerheads (36 G, 1.15 ERA) and Triple-A Zephyrs (2 G, 0.00 ERA), Nappo went 5-1 with a 1.11 ERA. His WHIP was 0.912. In 2014, between the Jacksonville Suns and New Orleans, Nappo was 3-0 with a 2.44 ERA, posting a 0.929 WHIP. He pitched for Jacksonville and New Orleans in 2015 and was 5-3 with a 2.49 ERA, averaging more than a strikeout per inning and posting a 1.031 WHIP. He began 2016 with New Orleans. He played for the Colombia national baseball team in the 2017 World Baseball Classic qualifiers. On June 19, 2017, Nappo was released by the Marlins.

References

External links
 

1988 births
Living people
African-American baseball players
American people of Colombian descent
Baseball players from Connecticut
Greensboro Grasshoppers players
Jacksonville Jumbo Shrimp players
Jacksonville Suns players
Jamestown Jammers players
Jupiter Hammerheads players
New Britain Bees players
New Orleans Baby Cakes players
New Orleans Zephyrs players
People from Madison, Connecticut
University of Connecticut alumni
2017 World Baseball Classic players
UConn Huskies baseball players
21st-century African-American sportspeople
20th-century African-American people